Based on a True Story is the first studio album by New Zealand group Fat Freddy's Drop. It was recorded in Wellington and released on the band's own label, The Drop. Based on a True Story  utilized the band's trademark dub, reggae, soul and funk influenced sound, and has been successful both in terms of sales and of critical reception. The album followed years of regular touring within New Zealand, a live album, several singles, and appearances on numerous compilation albums in New Zealand and internationally.

Whilst the track listing named previously successful singles such as "Hope" and "This Room", these songs were in fact rerecorded in entirely new versions for the album. Based on a True Story has to date also spawned a highly successful single in its own right: Wandering Eye, which was awarded the prize for Best Music Video at the 2006 New Zealand Music Awards (18 October).

The album made an impact internationally as well. Listeners of Gilles Peterson's BBC Worldwide Program voted it as Album of the Year for 2005.

Sales and recognition

The album debuted at number 1 and went gold in its first day, and so far has become the longest album by a New Zealand group/artist to stay at number 1 (10 weeks). As of June 23, 2016 the album had been in the New Zealand charts for 108 weeks and had gone 9 times Platinum, selling over 135,000 copies .

In 2005, Based on a True Story won the New Zealand Music Awards for 'Album of the Year', an unusual achievement for an independent label. 'Based On A True Story' also features appearances from New Zealand musicians including Ladi 6, P Digsss, Hollie Smith, Rio Hemopo & Riki Gooch, Nick Gaffaney, Chris Yeabsley & Aaron Tokona.

Track listing

Band members
Joe Dukie (Dallas Tamaira) - Vocals
Tony Chang (Toby Laing) - Trumpet
Fulla Flash (Warren Maxwell) - Saxophone
Jetlag Johnson (Tehi Kerr) - Electric Guitar
Dobie Blaze (Iain Gordon) - Keyboards
DJ Fitchie (DJ Mu) - Mix
Hopepa (Joe Lindsay) - Trombone
MC slave (mc)

External links
 Review of the album by the BBC
 Amplifier.co.nz - Based on a True Story
 Smokecds.com - Buy the CD

2005 debut albums
Fat Freddy's Drop albums